Meelick is a small village situated some 5 km west-southwest of Swinford in County Mayo, Ireland.

Meelick round tower 
A 21-metre high round tower next to the cemetery is the sole surviving structure of an early monastery. Restored in 1880, the tower is flat-topped, having lost its original bell-storey and cap. It is believed to have been built at some time between 923 and 1013 AD on the site of an ecclesiastical foundation attributed to Saint Broccaidh.

See also
 List of towns and villages in Ireland

References

External links
Meelick round tower (images and further information)
Meelick round tower (tourist guide)

Towns and villages in County Mayo